Cravo River may refer to:

Cravo Norte River
Cravo Sur River